Salvation Lies Within is the debut studio album of the Swedish doom metal band Faith. It was originally self-released by the band in 2003 only on vinyl, the first 150 copies coming in yellow vinyl with a promotional 1987 poster. The album was re-released in 2005 on CD by the Italian label Doom Symphony, with two bonus tracks: "Possession" and "Hymn of the Sinner".

Track listing
"Hatred - 05:13
"Now It's Gone	- 07:48
"Cloak Of Darkness - 04:02
"Dark Fate - 07:31
"The Real Me - 06:32
"The Maze - 05:39
"Searching - 09:29
"Death Sleep" - 02:15

Track listing on 2005 Re-Release
"Hatred - 05:13
"Now It's Gone	- 07:48
"Cloak of Darkness - 04:02
"Possession" - 05:09
"Dark Fate - 07:31
"The Real Me - 06:32
"The Maze - 05:39
"Searching - 09:29
"Hymn of the Sinner" - 04.59
"Death Sleep" - 02:15

Artwork
The front cover is a detail from Christ of St. John of the Cross, a painting by Salvador Dalí.

Credits
Roger Johansson - Guitars 
Christer Nilsson - Bass, Vocals
Peter Svensson - Drums

Guests
Janne Stark - Guitar solo on "Dark Fate"
Jorgen Thuresson - Guitar solo on "Searching"
Anders Smedenmark - Keyharp on "Now It's Gone"
Annika Haptén - Vocals on "Possession" and "Death Sleep"
Tobias Svensson - Voice

References

2003 debut albums
Faith (band) albums